Lamprolectica apicistrigata is a moth of the family Gracillariidae. It is found in South Africa, Nigeria and Gambia.

The larvae feed on Deinbollia oblongifolia. They probably mine the leaves of their host plant.

References

Acrocercopinae
Moths of Africa
Moths described in 1891